List of ethicists including religious or political figures recognized by those outside their tradition as having made major contributions to ideas about ethics, or raised major controversies by taking strong positions on previously unexplored problems.

All are known for an ethical work or problem, but a few are primarily authors or satirists, or known as a mediator, politician, futurist or scientist, rather than as an ethicist or philosopher.  Some controversial figures are included, some of whom you may see as bad examples.  A few are included because their names have become synonymous with certain ethical debates, but only if they personally elaborated an ethical theory justifying their actions.

A
 Peter Abelard
 Ambedkar
 John Stevens Cabot Abbott
 Mortimer Adler
 Nayef Al-Rodhan
 Thomas Aquinas
 Nomy Arpaly
 Ambrose
 Andronicus of Rhodes
 Julia Annas
 G. E. M. Anscombe
 Karl-Otto Apel
 Jacob M. Appel
 Aristotle
 Aristoxenus
 John Arthur
  Benedict Ashley, OP
 Ashoka
 Augustine of Hippo
 Avicenna
 Joxe Azurmendi

B
 Bahá'u'lláh
 Franz Xaver von Baader
 Francis Bacon
 Alain Badiou
 Samuel Bailey
 Tom Beauchamp
 Saint Robert Bellarmine, S.J.
 David Benatar
 Friedrich Eduard Beneke
 Jeremy Bentham
 Thomas Berry
 Maurice Blanchot
 Dietrich Bonhoeffer
 Murray Bookchin
 George Boole
 Nick Bostrom
 Daniel Brock
 Martin Buber
 Gautama Buddha
 Mario Bunge
 Judith Butler

C
 Albert Camus
 Arthur Caplan
 Roger Chao
 James Childress
 Saint Bernard of Clairvaux, O.Cist
 Randy Cohen
 Confucius
 John M. Cooper
 Michael Cranford
 Alice Crary
 Roger Crisp
 Simon Critchley
 David Crocker
 Noam Chomsky

D
 Mary Daly
 Norman Daniels
 Partha Dasgupta
 Abraham ibn Daud
 Charles De Koninck
 Miguel A. De La Torre
 Cora Diamond
 Philip Doddridge
 Elliot N. Dorff
 Julia Driver
 Ronald Dworkin

E
 Epicurus
 Rudolf Christoph Eucken

F
 Johann Albert Fabricius
 Ismail Raji' al-Faruqi
 Nosson Tzvi Finkel
 John Finnis
 Joseph Fins
 Owen Flanagan
 Joseph Fletcher
 Philippa Foot
 William K. Frankena
 Alexander Campbell Fraser
 R. Edward Freeman
 R. G. Frey
 Erich Fromm

G
 Raimond Gaita
 Mohandas Gandhi
  Reginald Garrigou-Lagrange, OP
 David Gauthier
 Alan Gewirth
 Al-Ghazali
 Allan Gibbard
 Peter Goldie
 Victor Gollancz
 Celia Green
 Thomas Hill Green
 Stanley Grenz
 Hugo Grotius
 Tenzin Gyatso, the 14th Dalai Lama

H
 Jürgen Habermas
 Hammurabi
 R. M. Hare
 Gilbert Harman
Sam Harris
 John Harsanyi
 Robert S. Hartman
 Stanley Hauerwas
 Henry Hazlitt
 Paul Hawken
 Martin Heidegger
 Erich Heller
 Claude Adrien Helvétius
 Johann Friedrich Herbart
 Abraham Joshua Heschel
 Hierocles of Alexandria
 James Hinton
 Thomas Hobbes
 Wau Holland
Oscar Horta
 Hans-Hermann Hoppe
 David Hume
 John Peters Humphrey - author of UN Declaration of Universal Human Rights
 Edward Hundert
 Rosalind Hursthouse
 Francis Hutcheson
 Thomas Henry Huxley

I
 Lauri Ingman
 Alija Izetbegović

J
 Jane Jacobs - author of Systems of Survival
 Paul Janet
 Francis Jeffrey
 Théodore Simon Jouffroy
 Jesus of Nazareth
 John Paul II

K
 Shelly Kagan
 Immanuel Kant - Metaphysic of Ethics
 Rushworth Kidder
 Søren Kierkegaard
 Martin Luther King Jr.
 İoanna Kuçuradi
 Israel Kirzner
 Lawrence Kohlberg
 Mario Kopić
 Christine Korsgaard
 David Korten
 Tadeusz Kotarbiński
 Peter Kropotkin
 Hans Küng

L
 Louis Lavelle
 Aldo Leopold
 Barron H. Lerner
 Emmanuel Levinas
 Saint Alphonsus Liguori CSsR
 Andrew Linzey
 D. Stephen Long
 John Locke
 Antoine Garaby de La Luzerne
 Moshe Chaim Luzzatto

M
 Niccolò Machiavelli
 Alasdair MacIntyre
 J. L. Mackie
William MacAskill
 Maimonides
 Mao Zedong
 Marcion of Sinope
 Jack Mahoney
 Jacques Maritain
 James Martineau
 John McDowell
 Glenn McGee
 Ralph McInerny
 Donella Meadows
 Peter Medawar
 Mencius
 Menedemus
 Alan Morinis
 Mozi
 Fatema Mernissi
 Mary Midgley
 James Mill
 John Stuart Mill
 Moses – the Ethical Decalogue
 Michele Moody-Adams
 G. E. Moore
 Radhakamal Mukerjee
 Iris Murdoch

N
 Thomas Nagel
 Seyyed Hossein Nasr
 Oswald von Nell-Breuning
 H. Richard Niebuhr
 Reinhold Niebuhr
 Friedrich Nietzsche
 Carlos Santiago Nino
 Karl Immanuel Nitzsch
 David L. Norton
 Robert Nozick
 Martha Nussbaum
 Guru Nanak

O
 Hilda D. Oakeley
 John Joseph O'Connor
 Onora O'Neill
 Michel Onfray

P
 Blaise Pascal
 Bahya ibn Paquda
 Derek Parfit
 David Pearce
 Philip Pettit
 Philo of Alexandria
 Plato
 Tess Posner
 Noel Preston
 Richard Price
 Prodicus

Q
 Quintilian

R
 Fazlur Rahman
 Peter Railton
 Ayn Rand
 John Rawls
 Joseph Raz
 Tom Regan
 George Croom Robertson
 Richard Rorty
 W. D. Ross
 Murray Rothbard
 Jean-Jacques Rousseau
 John Ruskin
 Emma Rush
 Bertrand Russell

S
 Marquis de Sade
 Edward Said
Israel Salanter
Michael J. Sandel
 Julian Savulescu
 Ziauddin Sardar
 John Ralston Saul
 Geoffrey Sayre-McCord
 Giovanni Battista Scaramelli
 T. M. Scanlon
 Zalman Schachter-Shalomi
 Samuel Scheffler
 Max Scheler
 Friedrich Schiller
 Friedrich Daniel Ernst Schleiermacher
 Karl Wilhelm Friedrich von Schlegel
 Moritz Schlick
 Frank Schmalleger
 David Schmidtz
 Arthur Schopenhauer
 Albert Schweitzer
 Amartya Sen
 Lucius Annaeus Seneca
 Russ Shafer-Landau
 Henry Sidgwick
 Georg Simmel
 Peter Singer
 B. F. Skinner
 J. J. C. Smart
 Adam Smith
 Holly Martin Smith
 Michael A. Smith
 Wesley J. Smith
 Vladimir Solovyov
 Margaret Somerville
 Herbert Spencer
 Baruch Spinoza
 John Shelby Spong
 Walter Terence Stace
 Olaf Stapledon
 Charles Stevenson
 Dugald Stewart
 Max Stirner
 Stobaeus
Ira F. Stone
 Jeffrey Stout
 Leslie Stephen
 David Friedrich Strauss
 Sun Yat-sen

T
 Gabriele Taylor
 Jenny Teichman
 Larry Temkin
 Judith Jarvis Thomson
 Paul Tillich
 Hsun Tzu
 Leo Tolstoy
 Joan Tronto
 Konstantin Tsiolkovsky
 Thiruvalluvar

U to Z
 Henry Babcock Veatch
 Francisco de Vitoria
 Johann Georg Walch
 William George Ward
 Otto Weininger
 William Whewell
 Philip Wicksteed
 Benjamin Wiker
 Daniel Wikler
 Bernard Williams
 Susan Wolf
 Christian Wolff (philosopher)
 William Wollaston
 Xenocrates
 Xunzi
 John Howard Yoder
Simcha Zissel Ziv
 Theodor Zwinger
 Swami Vivekananda
 Zoroaster

See also 
 Index of ethics articles
 List of ethics topics
 List of philosophers
 Outline of ethics

References

Lists of philosophers
Ethics lists